Ahab (869–850 BC) was a Hebrew king.

Ahab may also refer to:
 
 Captain Ahab, a character in the novel Moby-Dick
 Ahab (band), a German funeral doom metal band founded in 2004
 "Ahab the Arab", a song by Ray Stevens

 Ahab (prophet), an impious prophet in the time of the Babylonian captivity of Judah (Book of Jeremiah 29:21)

See also 
 Captain Ahab (disambiguation)